The 1965 Cupa României Final was the 27th final of Romania's most prestigious football cup competition. It was disputed between Ştiinţa Cluj and Dinamo Piteşti, and was won by Ştiinţa Cluj after a game with 3 goals. It was the 1st cup for Ştiinţa Cluj.

Match details

See also 
List of Cupa României finals

References

External links
Romaniansoccer.ro

1965
Cupa
Romania